Kurt Jara (born 14 October 1950) is an Austrian football manager and former player who played as a midfielder.

Playing career

Club career
Born in Innsbruck, Jara started his professional career with local side FC Wacker Innsbruck before moving to Spanish outfit Valencia CF in 1973. After two seasons in La Liga he joined German Bundesliga team MSV Duisburg where he spent five seasons and reached the UEFA Cup semi-finals in 1979. After another season in Germany with FC Schalke 04, he finished his career in the Swiss Super League with Grasshopper. Immediately after retiring as a player, he became manager at Grasshopper.

International career
He made his debut for Austria in a July 1971 friendly match in Sao Paulo against Brazil and was a participant at the 1978 and 1982 World Cups. He earned 59 caps, scoring 14 goals. His last international was an April 1985 World Cup qualification match against Hungary.

Managerial career
As a manager, he coached in the past the Swiss clubs Grasshopper, FC St. Gallen and FC Zürich, the Austrian team VfB Mödling, Xanthi, APOEL, FC Tirol Innsbruck, Hamburger SV and 1. FC Kaiserslautern. In the season 2005–06 he was the manager of Red Bull Salzburg.

Career statistics

Honours

Player
 Austrian Football Bundesliga: 1970–71, 1971–72, 1972–73
 Austrian Cup: 1969–70, 1972–73
 Swiss Super League: 1981–82, 1982–83, 1983–84
 Swiss Cup: 1982–83

Manager
Grasshoppers
 Swiss Cup: 1987–88

Hamburger SV
DFL-Ligapokal: 2003

References

External links
 
 
 

Living people
1950 births
Sportspeople from Innsbruck
Footballers from Tyrol (state)
Association football midfielders
Austrian footballers
Austrian expatriate footballers
Austria international footballers
1978 FIFA World Cup players
1982 FIFA World Cup players
FC Wacker Innsbruck players
Valencia CF players
MSV Duisburg players
FC Schalke 04 players
Grasshopper Club Zürich players
Austrian Football Bundesliga players
La Liga players
Bundesliga players
Swiss Super League players
Expatriate footballers in Spain
Expatriate footballers in West Germany
Expatriate footballers in Switzerland
Austrian football managers
Expatriate football managers in Greece
Expatriate football managers in Cyprus
Expatriate football managers in Germany
Grasshopper Club Zürich managers
FC St. Gallen managers
FC Zürich managers
Xanthi F.C. managers
APOEL FC managers
Hamburger SV managers
1. FC Kaiserslautern managers
FC Red Bull Salzburg managers
Bundesliga managers
Austrian expatriate football managers
Austrian expatriate sportspeople in Spain
Austrian expatriate sportspeople in West Germany
FC Tirol Innsbruck managers
Austrian expatriate sportspeople in Greece
Austrian expatriate sportspeople in Germany